The Schelenburg is a water castle in Schledehausen, municipality of Bissendorf, Lower Saxony, Germany.

Built in the Weser Renaissance style, it is one of the oldest castles of the Osnabrücker Land.

Famous people
Eduard von Schele zu Schelenburg

Bibliography
 Römisch-Germanisches Zentralmuseum (ed.): Führer zu vor- und frühgeschichtlichen Denkmälern - Das Osnabrücker Land III, vol. 44, Verlag Philipp von Zabern, Mainz 1979, 
 Gabriele Brasse: Schloß Schelenburg (Schnell, Kunstführer No. 1898). Munich/Zurich 1992
 Ernst Andreas Friedrich: Die Schelenburg bei Osnabrück, pages 150–152, in: Wenn Steine reden könnten, vol. III, Landbuch-Verlag, Hannover 1995, .

External links

 Website
 Pictures

Bissendorf
Castles in Lower Saxony
Water castles in Germany